Horton is a rural town and locality in the Bundaberg Region, Queensland, Australia.

Geography 
The Bruce Highway forms the southern boundary of the locality.

History 
The town was possibly named after sugar planter George Horton.

A Methodist Church was opened in Horton in 1886. Due to the decline of the Horton township the church was subsequently moved to Childers. It became the Childers Uniting Church in June 1977 following the amalgamation of the Methodist Church into the Uniting Church in Australia in 1977. It is now listed on the Bundaberg Heritage Register.

The first section of the Isis railway line branched from the North Coast railway line at Goodwood. It opened to Childers on 31 October 1887 with intermediate stations at Bootharh, Horton and Doolbi. The line closed in 1964.

Horton State School opened about 1888. In 1900, it was renamed Doolbi State School. The school closed in 1953. It was at 204 Goodwood Road, now the site of the clubhouse of the Isis Golf Club in neighbouring Doolbi.

Education 
There are no schools in Horton. The nearest government primary school is Childers State School in Childers to the west. The nearest government secondary school is Isis District State High School, also in Childers.

References

External links 

 
 Town map of Horton, 1975

Towns in Queensland
Localities in Queensland
Bundaberg Region